Knud Rex (30 March 1912 – 24 December 1968) was a Danish stage and film actor.

Filmography
 Sun Over Denmark - 1936
Den gamle præst - 1939
Komtessen på Stenholt - 1939
Frøken Kirkemus - 1941
Natekspressen (P. 903) - 1942
Ta', hvad du vil ha' - 1947
Lejlighed til leje - 1949
Den stjålne minister - 1949
Hejrenæs - 1953
 Hidden Fear - 1957
Englen i sort - 1957
Mig og min familie - 1957
Skarpe skud i Nyhavn - 1957
Lyssky transport gennem Danmark - 1958
Skibet er ladet med - 1960
Duellen - 1962
En ven i bolignøden - 1965
Slå først, Frede - 1965
Utro - 1966
Hunger - 1966
Mennesker mødes og sød musik opstår i hjertet - 1967
Lille mand, pas på! - 1968

External links

Knud Rex at Danskefilm.dk

Danish male stage actors
Danish male film actors
Danish male actors
Male actors from Copenhagen
1912 births
1968 deaths
20th-century Danish male actors